The 2020–21 Super League of Malawi (known as the TNM Super League for sponsorship reasons) was the 35th season of the Super League of Malawi, the top professional league for association football clubs in Malawi since its establishment in 1986. Nyasa Big Bullets are the defending champions. It started on 28 November 2020 before it was postponed in March 2021 due to the COVID-19 pandemic in Malawi.

The season ended on 16 October 2021. Nyasa Big Bullets wins the third consecutive Super League title and the fifteenth overall.

Teams 
Sixteen teams competed in the league – the top thirteen teams from the previous season and the three promoted teams from the regional leagues: Ekwendeni Hammers, MAFCO Salima and Red Lions FC.
Other changes
 Mzuni FC (Mzuzu University FC) was renamed as Mzuzu Warriors.

 Be Forward Wanderers were renamed Mighty Wanderers during the season.

Stadiums and locations

League table

References

External links
Official Website

2020-21
Malawi